Afroeurydemus signatus is a species of leaf beetle of Angola, described by Maurice Pic in 1940.

References 

Eumolpinae
Insects of Angola
Endemic fauna of Angola
Taxa named by Maurice Pic
Beetles described in 1940